William Rufus Nicholson (January 8, 1822 - June 7, 1901) was a bishop of the Reformed Episcopal Church and one of the first professors at the Theological Seminary of the Reformed Episcopal Church. Nicholson received an honorary Doctor of Divinity degree from Kenyon College in Ohio. When the Reformed Episcopal Seminary was founded, Nicholson became Dean and one of its first professors. He also wrote a commentary on the book of Colossians titled Oneness with Christ.

Biography
Nicholson was born in Greene County, Mississippi, on January 8, 1822, where his father was a judge. He converted to Christianity as a result of attending a Methodist camp in 1835. After attending LaGrange College, the Methodist Episcopal College in LaGrange, Georgia, he was ordained at the age of twenty and served four years in New Orleans. He transferred to the Protestant Episcopal Church in 1847 and was ordained by Bishop Leonidas Polk. Having served four churches in this denomination (in New Orleans, LA; Cincinnati, OH; Boston, MA and Newark, NJ), he decided to transfer to the Reformed Episcopal Church in 1875. That same year he was elected bishop, with his consecration by Bishop George David Cummins taking place on February 24, 1876, in Philadelphia. He served as bishop of the New York and Philadelphia Synod of the Reformed Episcopal Church until his death. 

Nicholson died on June 7, 1901 in Philadelphia. He was buried in Forest Hills Cemetery, Boston.

See also 
 List of bishops of the Reformed Episcopal Church

References

Further reading
Acker, Raymond A. A History of the Reformed Episcopal Seminary: 1886–1964 (Philadelphia: The Theological Seminary of the Reformed Episcopal Church, 1965).

External links 
 William Rufus Nicholson, D.D. Bishop of the Reformed Episcopal Church 1903 biographical article
 The Priesthood of the Church of God: Sermon Preached at the Opening of the Fourth General Council of the Reformed Episcopal Church, in Emmanuel Church, Ottawa 1876 sermon by Nicholson

People from Greene County, Mississippi
1822 births
1901 deaths
American Reformed Episcopalians
Reformed Episcopal Seminary faculty
Bishops of the Reformed Episcopal Church
LaGrange College alumni